Petone is a former parliamentary electorate in the lower Hutt Valley of New Zealand, from 1946 to 1978. The electorate was represented by two Members of Parliament from the Labour Party.

Population centres
The 1941 New Zealand census had been postponed due to World War II, so the 1946 electoral redistribution had to take ten years of population growth and movements into account. The North Island gained a further two electorates from the South Island due to faster population growth. The abolition of the country quota through the Electoral Amendment Act, 1945 reduced the number and increased the size of rural electorates. None of the existing electorates remained unchanged, 27 electorates were abolished, eight former electorates were re-established, and 19 electorates were created for the first time, including Petone. The electorate was based on the southern part of the city of Lower Hutt. Settlements within the electorate included the suburb of Petone, Wainuiomata, and Eastbourne.

The Petone electorate was abolished through the 1977 electoral redistribution. Most of its area went to the  electorate, while some area, including the suburb of Petone, transferred to the  electorate.

History
Its first representative was Mick Moohan of the Labour Party, who was Minister of Railways from 1957 to 1960 while serving the electorate. Moohan died in office on 7 February 1967.

He served until the electorate was abolished in 1978, and moved to the Pencarrow electorate.

Members of Parliament
The Petone electorate was represented by two Members of Parliament.

Key

Election results

1975 election

1972 election

1969 election

1967 by-election

1966 election

1963 election

1960 election

1957 election

1954 election

1951 election

1949 election

1946 election

Notes

References

Historical electorates of New Zealand
1946 establishments in New Zealand
1978 disestablishments in New Zealand
Politics of the Wellington Region